Kick & Fennick is a platform video game developed and published by Dutch indie studio Jaywalkers Interactive for PlayStation Vita. It was released in North America on 3 February 2015 and in Europe the following day. The game was also released free for PlayStation Plus members. On 28 January 2016, Abstraction Games  announced on Twitter that they are bringing the game to Nintendo's Wii U. The two companies announced that the game will be released on the PlayStation 4, Wii U, and Xbox One in June 2016.

Reception

Kick & Fennick has received mixed reviews, holding a 64% score on GameRankings and a 65/100 on Metacritic. Writing for IGN, Tom McShea gave the game a rating of 7.7/10.

References

External links
 Kick & Fennick at Jaywalkers Interactive

Video games with 2.5D graphics
2015 video games
Indie video games
Platform games
Video games developed in the Netherlands
PlayStation 4 games
PlayStation Vita games
Wii U eShop games
Xbox One games

Single-player video games